"Thank You Pretty Baby" is 1959 R&B/pop hit by Brook Benton.  The song was written by Brook Benton and Clyde Otis.

Chart performance
The single was the second release for Benton as solo artist to reach number one on the R&B charts. It held the top spot for four weeks.  "Thank You Pretty Baby" was a successful crossover hit, peaking at number sixteen on the Billboard Hot 100.

Cover version
The track was covered by Curley Bridges on his 1999 album, Keys to the Blues.

References

1959 singles
Brook Benton songs
Songs written by Clyde Otis
1959 songs
Songs written by Brook Benton